Plexim GmbH, or Plexim, is providing simulation software for power electronic systems. The product, PLECS, is used for product development in power electronics. The area of application includes renewable energy, automotive, aerospace, industrial and traction drives, and power supplies. 

Plexim is located in Zurich and Boston and has local representatives worldwide.

History
Plexim GmbH was founded as a spinoff company from the Swiss Federal Institute of Technology (ETH Zurich) in June 2002. It was first associated with the Power Systems Laboratory at the Department of Information Technology and Electrical Engineering. It then moved its offices to Technopark Zürich.

In April 2009, Plexim opened an office in Cambridge, Massachusetts.

Products
See also:

 Plecs

External links
 Plexim company page

References 

Software companies of Switzerland
Software companies established in 2002
2002 establishments in Switzerland
2009 establishments in Massachusetts